The Porta Caelimontana or Celimontana was a gate in the Servian Wall on the rise of the Caelian Hill (Caelius Mons).

Use

The Via Caelimontana ran from it; in the late 19th and early 20th centuries, Roman tombs were discovered along its southern edge, some of which have disappeared.

History
The gate was rebuilt during the principate of Augustus. According to an inscription, the Arch of Dolabella was built in the area in AD 10, during the consulship of Dolabella and Silanus, but there is disagreement over whether this arch was the reconstruction of the Porta Caelimontana. The arch was incorporated into the support structure for the branch aqueduct of the Aqua Claudia built during the reign of Nero, it is presumed during the rebuilding program that followed the Great Fire of 64.

During the Renaissance, the Porta Caelimontana was a toll gate.

References

External links
Map showing the Porta Caelimontana in Leonardo Benevolo, Historie de la ville (Editions Parenthèses, 1975, 2004), p. 95 online.

Ancient Roman buildings and structures in Rome
Gates in the Servian Wall